Henrique Villaret (born 10 December 1964) is a Portuguese swimmer. He competed in the men's 4 × 100 metre freestyle relay at the 1988 Summer Olympics.

References

1964 births
Living people
Portuguese male swimmers
Olympic swimmers of Portugal
Swimmers at the 1988 Summer Olympics
Place of birth missing (living people)